Gustavo Zagrebelsky (born 1 June 1943) is an Italian judge and constitutionalist.

Zagrebelsky was born in San Germano Chisone, brother of Vladimiro Zagrebelsky, judge at the European Court of Human Rights. He was appointed as a judge on Constitutional Court of Italy by the President of Italy on 9 September 1995, swearing on his honour on 13 September 1995. He was elected President of the Italian Constitutional Court on 28 January 2004 and ceased his President office on 13 September 2004.

References

1943 births
Living people
People from the Province of Turin
20th-century Italian judges
Presidents of the Constitutional Court of Italy
Academic staff of the University of Turin
Italian people of Russian descent
21st-century Italian judges